The 1960–61 season was the 77th football season in which Dumbarton competed at a Scottish national level, entering the Scottish Football League, the Scottish Cup and the Scottish League Cup.  In addition Dumbarton competed in the Stirlingshire Cup.

Scottish Second Division

Another good start to the season - unbeaten in the first four games - was not maintained and Dumbarton never really managed to progress above mid-table, finishing in 10th place with 35 points, 20 behind champions Stirling Albion.

Scottish League Cup

With 3 wins and 3 draws from their 6 games, Dumbarton won their section in the League Cup, and following a play off win over Cowdenbeath, lost a close encounter with Queen of the South in the quarter finals.

Scottish Cup

In the Scottish Cup, Dumbarton had another early exit, losing to Alloa Athletic in the second round, having received a first round bye.

Stirlingshire Cup
Locally Dumbarton again lost out to Falkirk in the semi final of the Stirlingshire Cup, after a drawn game.

Friendlies
Finally, amongst the friendlies played during the season were home and away fixtures against English Northern Counties League opponents, Gateshead.

Player statistics

Squad 

|}

Source:

Transfers
Amongst those players joining and leaving the club were the following:

Players in

Players out 

Source:

Reserve team
Dumbarton played only one competitive 'reserve' match in the Scottish Second XI Cup, heavily defeated by Kilmarnock in the first round.

References

Dumbarton F.C. seasons
Scottish football clubs 1960–61 season